Stanley Knox Gullan (26 January 1926 – 29 June 1999) was a Scottish footballer, who played as a goalkeeper for Dumbarton, Clyde, Queens Park Rangers, Tunbridge Wells, Berwick Rangers, Third Lanark, Montrose and Stenhousemuir. Gullan played in the 1949 Scottish Cup Final for Clyde.

References

External links

1926 births
1999 deaths
Footballers from Edinburgh
Scottish footballers
Association football goalkeepers
Dumbarton F.C. players
Clyde F.C. players
Queens Park Rangers F.C. players
Tunbridge Wells F.C. players
Berwick Rangers F.C. players
Third Lanark A.C. players
Montrose F.C. players
Stenhousemuir F.C. players
Scottish Football League players
English Football League players